Fabio Toninelli (born 1975) is an Italian mathematician who works in probability theory, stochastic processes and probabilistic aspects of mathematical physics.

Education
He obtained his PhD in physics,  in 2003, from Scuola Normale Superiore di Pisa.

Career
Between 2004 and 2020 he was senior researcher at Centre National de la Recherche Scientifique (CNRS) in Lyon. Since 2020 he has been Professor of Mathematics at Technische Universität Wien.

He is currently (2021–2024) co-editor-in-chief (jointly with Bálint Tóth) of the journal Probability Theory and Related Fields.

Research
Toninelli has contributed substantially to the mathematical theory of disordered statistical mechanical systems, mixing of Markov chains, dimer models. His most significant contributions concern the theory of mean-field spin glasses, of polymers in random environments and of stochastic interface dynamics.

Recognition
Toninelli was an invited speaker of the International Congress of Mathematicians ICM-2018 (Rio de Janeiro), and invited plenary speaker of the International Congress on Mathematical Physics ICMP-2018 (Montreal), and of the Conference on Stochastic Processes and their Applications SPA-2014 (Buenos Aires).

References

External links 

Living people
1975 births
Italian mathematicians
Academic staff of TU Wien
Probability Theory and Related Fields editors